Peotyle is a genus of moths in the family Choreutidae.

Species
Peotyle atmodesma (Meyrick, 1933)
Peotyle batangensis (Caradja, 1940)

External links
choreutidae.lifedesks.org
Peotyle at funet

Choreutidae